This is a list of notable Venezuelan Americans, including both original immigrants who obtained American citizenship and their American descendants.

To be included in this list, the person must have a Wikipedia article showing they are Venezuelan Americans or must have references showing they are Venezuelan Americans and are notable.

List

Architects and builders 
 Maria Cristina Anzola – Venezuelan architect. Currently serves as a Director of New York City Ballet, Inc.
 Anita Berrizbeitia – Venezuelan landscape theorist, teacher, and author. Professor of Landscape Architecture at the Harvard Graduate School of Design
 Carlos Brillembourg – Venezuelan architect based in New York, founder of Carlos Brillembourg Architects
 Monica Ponce de Leon – architect with offices in Ann Arbor, New York and Boston. Dean of the School of Architecture at Princeton University. First Hispanic architect to receive the National Design Award in Architecture
 Carolina Izsak – After the pageant as Miss Venezuela 1991 she completed architecture studies and currently resides in Boston, Massachusetts, US
Carlos Zapata– Venezuelan architect with his office headquartered in New York City

Entrepreneurs and business people 
 Guido Antonini Wilson – entrepreneur
Fabiola Beracasa Beckman, Venezuelan born film and television producer, philanthropist and co-owner of The Hole Gallery, an art gallery in New York City
 Adriana Cisneros – Venezuelan journalist. CEO and Vice Chairman of Cisneros Group
 Patricia Phelps de Cisneros – Venezuelan philanthropist with focus on art collection and education
 Gustavo Cisneros – Venezuelan-born mass media entrepreneur
 Andres Gluski – CEO of AES Corporation
 Thor Halvorssen Hellum – Venezuelan-Norwegian businessman who served as President of CANTV and later as Special Commissioner for International Narcotic Affairs
 Janet Kelly – American-born editor owner of The Daily Journal (Venezuela)
 Hilda Ochoa-Brillembourg – Venezuelan business woman and the current president of Strategic Investment Group (SIG)
 Solon De Leon Lobo – Venezuelan American editor, author 
 Andres Levin – record producer
Domingo Marcucci – shipbuilder and shipowner in San Francisco, California
 Nelson Mezerhane – banker, owner of Diario Las Americas of Miami, Florida 
 Vanessa Neumann – Venezuelan graduated in Columbia University. Founder, President & CEO of Asymmetrica, a New York-headquartered global consultancy on brand integrity and counter-illicit trafficking. The relationship with Mick Jagger (2000-2002) made her famous among world press
 Bárbara Palacios – Venezuelan TV Host, writer and Miss Universe 1986. CEO of BP Inspiration, where she's the main motivational speaker
 Claudio Osorio – Venezuelan entrepreneur based in Miami, Florida
 Devorah Rose – Editor-in-Chief of Social Life Magazine
 Irene Saez – Miss Universe 1981, former director of ColonialBank
 Jimy Szymanski – former professional tennist was Davis cup captain and Fed cup captain for Venezuela. President of STA TENNIS LLC, a company that manages tennis facilities in South Florida.
 Bill Watkins – Venezuelan-born former CEO of Seagate Technology, the world's largest manufacturer of hard drives

Artists and designers 
 Julio Aguilera – Venezuelan-American painter and sculptor born in Caracas
 Devendra Banhart – Venezuelan American singer-songwriter and visual artist
 Juan Fernando Bastos – Venezuelan born painter
 Jorge Blanco – Venezuelan artist who created the comic strip The Castaway/El Náufrago, which became an overnight success
 Nicolas Felizola – fashion designer
 Rodner Figueroa – TV host, fashion designer and philanthropist
 Nina Fuentes, a.k.a. Nina Dotti – Venezuelan art collector, curator, philanthropist, business woman and art dealer
 Marisol Escobar – Venezuelan-American sculptor born in Paris
 Carolina Herrera – fashion designer.  Also Founder and CEO of New York-based CH Carolina Herrera
 Tina Ramirez – dancer and choreographer, best known as the Founder and Artistic Director of Ballet Hispanico
 Angel Sanchez – fashion designer
 Nick Verreos – American fashion designer, fashion commentator and former Project Runway contestant
 Jhonen Vasquez – American comic book writer, cartoonist, and music video director
 Patricia van Dalen – Venezuelan visual artist based in Miami (Florida)
 Ron van Dongen – photographer
 Victor Hugo (artist and window dresser) – Venezuelan visual artist, window dresser, and Andy Warhol´s collaborator, partner of fashion designer Halston.

Comedians 
 Julio Gassete – Venezuelan-born TV former comedian of Bienvenidos TV show. He lives currently in Miami, Florida
 Joanna Hausmann – comedian youtuber
 Erika de la Vega – Venezuelan stand up comedy actress and fashion model
 Monica Pasqualotto – actress, model and TV host in Americateve

Films and TV 
 Cristina Abuhazi – Venezuelan actress, model, and TV host in Sony YouTube America Latina Network
 Arthur Albert – Venezuelan-born American cinematographer and television director
 America Alonso – Venezuelan actress
 Fred Armisen – actor, comedian, musician. He attended the School of Visual Arts (NYC)
 Elizabeth Avellán – film producer, born in Venezuela
 Donna Barrell (1889 – 1941) – screenwriter and actress. She was daughter of Venezuelan tenor Fernando Michelena (1858–1921)
 Daniela Bascopé – American born, raised in Venezuela as Telenovela actress
 Maria Beatty – Venezuelan-born American filmmaker who directs, acts, and produces
 Fabiola Beracasa Beckman – Venezuelan film and television producer and philanthropist. Co-owner of The Hole Gallery, in New York City
 Horacio Bocaranda – film director
 Víctor Cámara – actor
 Tatiana Capote – telenovela actress. Cuban-born, Venezuelan-raised
Rosa Castro Martínez- silent movies actress
 Grecia Colmenares – actress of telenovelas who gained fame across Latin America, especially during the 1980s
 Gabriel Coronel – actor of telenovelas and model
 Jesse Corti – Venezuelan-born, American voice actor
 Alejandro Chaban – Venezuelan-born, telenovela actor
 Mara Croatto – Venezuelan-born Puerto Rican actress
 Majandra Delfino – Venezuelan born actress
 Christina Dieckmann – Venezuelan-born actress
 Andrew Divoff – Venezuelan-born actor
 Wanda D'Isidoro – Venezuelan actress, born in Boston
 Pablo Fenjves – Venezuelan-born American screenwriter and ghostwriter based in Los Angeles, California
Lupita Ferrer- Venezuelan born actress based in Miami, Florida
 Silvana Gallardo (1953–2012) – American film and television actress
 Carlos González (cinematographer) – Venezuelan-born American cinematographer and director of film and television
Scarlet Gruber – Venezuelan actress and dancer
 Perla Haney-Jardine – Brazilian-born American actress. She is best known for her role in Kill Bill Vol. 2 as B.B. His father is Venezuelan born
 Michel Hausmann – Venezuelan-born theater director and producer
 Maria Elena Heredia – Venezuelan actress
 Alejandro Hernández Reinoso – Venezuelan film director, writer, humorist, singer-songwriter, composer
 Lilimar Hernandez – Venezuelan actress
Gledys Ibarra – Venezuelan television actress
 Betty Kaplan – Venezuelan film director, currently live in Los Angeles
 Moisés Kaufman – playwright, director and founder of Tectonic Theater Project.  In 2016 was awarded with the National Medal of Arts
 Kamala Lopez – actress, director, and political activist
 Alicia Machado – Venezuelan actress, Miss Universe 1996
 Willy Martin – Venezuelan-born, telenovela actor at Nickelodeon 
 Carlos Montilla – Venezuelan television and theater actor
 Lilibeth Morillo – actress
 Carlos Pena Jr. – American actor (Big Time Rush), singer, and dancer. His father is of Spanish and Venezuelan descent
 Clara Perez – film and television actress
 Elluz Peraza – Miss Venezuela 1976, actress
 Lele Pons – Venezuelan-born Internet personality and actress
 Édgar Ramírez – Venezuelan actor
 Julie Restifo – actress, American-born, Venezuelan-raised
 Génesis Rodríguez – lived in Miami, Florida. She finished school from Miami Country Day High School in 2015 and moved to Los Angeles, California actress, American-born
 Enrique Sapene – Venezuelan-born actor and producer based in Los Angeles
 Luis José Santander – American-born Venezuelan actor
 Sonya Smith – American-born Venezuelan actress
 Jason Silva – television personality, filmmaker, and public speaker
 Monica Spear (1984-2014) – Miss Venezuela 2004, actress of Telemundo network
 Carolina Tejera – actress
 Laura Termini – Venezuelan-born American actress, producer, writer, and a Board Certified Health/Beauty Counselor AADP
 Tammy Trull – American actress of Venezuelan and Cuban descent
 Orlando Urdaneta – Venezuelan actor
 Wilmer Valderrama – American actor of Venezuelan and Colombian descent
 Franklin Virgüez – actor
 Henry Zakka – Venezuelan actor and producer

Models 
 Consuelo Adler – Venezuelan top model, Miss International 1997
 Carmen María Montiel – Venezuelan pageant titleholder and journalist. Miss Venezuela 1984, Miss Universe 1984 2nd runner up. She lives in USA since 1989. 
Jennifer Rovero – Playboy's Playmate of the Month for July 1999 and has appeared in numerous Playboy videos
 Rita Verreos – Venezuelan-born beauty pageant contestant, image consultant, model, actress, and reality television contestant
 Patricia Velásquez – Venezuelan actress and fashion model

Musicians 
 Gregory Abbott – American born singer, his father was born in Venezuela
 Aldo Abreu – Venezuelan baroque flutist
 María Conchita Alonso – three time Grammy Award–nominated singer/songwriter and actress. Cuban-born, Venezuelan-raised, she is an American citizen
 Devendra Banhart – Singer and songwriter
 Josefina Benedetti – Venezuelan-American composer, musicologist and choral director.
 Augusto Brandt – violinist and composer
 Andréa Burns – singer
 Humberto Bruni Lamanna – descended from an Italian family, is a Classical Guitar concert artist.
 Ed Calle – saxophonist and composer from Miami, Florida, born in Venezuela. He has four nominations for Grammy Awards
 Mariah Carey – singer; her father Alfred Roy Carey was born in Venezuela
 Teresa Carreño – Venezuelan-born pianist and composer
 Sylvia Constantinidis – Venezuelan-born pianist, conductor, composer, writer and music educator. President of the Southeast Chapter of NACUSA (National Association of Composers of The United States of America)
 Tulio Cremisini – Venezuelan percussionist, composer and orchestra conductor
 Majandra Delfino – ALMA Award-nominated Venezuelan-born American actress and singer
 Yasmin Deliz – American singer-songwriter, model and actress. She is daughter of Dominican father and a Colombian-Venezuelan mother
 Paul Desenne – Venezuelan cellist and resident composer at Alabama Symphony Orchestra 
 Gustavo Dudamel – orchestra conductor and violinist. He is the music director of the Los Angeles Philharmonic in Los Angeles, California
 Pedro Eustache – flautist, "World Music" woodwinds-reeds-wind synthesizers and composer
 José Luis Gomez –  director of the Tucson Symphony Orchestra
 Glenn Garrido –  director of the Houston Latin American Philharmonic 
 Luis Gómez-Imbert – double bassist
 Lorenzo Herrera – former Venezuelan singer
 Hernan Hermida – vocalist of rock band Suicide Silence
 Enrique Hidalgo – Venezuelan composer
 Judith Jaimes – pianist
 Raphael Jiménez – associate professor of conducting and director of Oberlin College orchestras
 Rudy La Scala – singer and composer
Andres Levin-musician, record producer, bandleader
 Pablo Manavello – Italian-born Venezuelan composer, guitarist, singer and songwriter
 Manu Manzo – Venezuelan-born singer and songwriter
 Eduardo Marturet – composer, music director and principal conductor of The Miami Symphony Orchestra
 Gustavo Matamoros – composer-sound artist
 Fernando Michelena – Venezuelan tenor working in the United States in the late 19th and early 20th centuries. Michelena toured  with the Emma Abbott Grand Opera Company. He was the father of Beatriz, Vera and Teresa Luisa Michelena, all born in the US.
 Alfredo del Monaco – Venezuelan composer
 Silvano Monasterios – jazz pianist and composer
 Ricardo Montaner – Venezuelan singer and composer
 Angelic Montero – R&B singer and social media personality
 Gabriela Montero – pianist and composer
 Chris Moy – singer and former member of the Menudo teen group
 Luis Perdomo – jazz pianist and composer
 Allan Phillips – music producer, composer, arranger, and musician now residing in Southern California.
 Alejandro Enrique Planchart – Venezuelan-American musicologist, conductor, and composer
 Edward Pulgar – Venezuelan violinist and conductor
 Rudy Regalado – Venezuelan Latin music leader, percussionist and composer
 Jose Luis Rodríguez "El Puma" – singer and actor
Otmaro Ruíz – pianist and composer
Juan Carlos Salazar – singer, Cuatro-player and songwriter/composer in addition to being an engineer with an MBA, and university instructor
 William Sanchez – Venezuelan born Cuban guitarist of Los Van Van and orchestra conductor.
 Marger Sealey – singer, composer and actress
 Alberto Šlezinger – Venezuelan-born singer-songwriter and composer
 Jorge Spiteri– Venezuelan-born guitarist, singer-songwriter and composer. His father was born in USA
 Carmen Helena Téllez – Venezuelan-American music conductor
 Zamora – Venezuelan pianist and composer nominated on Grammy Award 2010 in the "New Age" music category

Sports
 Bob Abreu – Venezuelan baseball player
 José Altuve – Venezuelan baseball player for the Houston Astros and 2017 World Series champion
 Luis Aparicio – baseball player. Hall of Fame of MLB
 Nestor Aparicio – sportswriter and radio personality
 José de Armas – professional tennis player
Fannie Barrios – professional female bodybuilder
 Josh Barfield – Venezuelan-born American major league Baseball player
Gregor Blanco – Venezuelan Major League Baseball player
 Jesus Armando Bracho – Venezuelan jockey winner of the Eclipse Award for Outstanding Apprentice Jockey in 1992 but was suspended, then surrendered his award to Rosemary Homeister, Jr. for falsifying his racing papers
 Miguel Cabrera – baseball player. In 2012 became the first player since Carl Yastrzemski in 1967 to win the Triple Crown in batting
 Alfonso Carrasquel – Venezuelan-born Major League Baseball player
 Abel Castellano Jr. – Venezuelan jockey
 Javier Castellano – Venezuelan jockey, recipient of four Eclipse Award for Outstanding Jockey in the row (2013, 2014, 2015 and 2016). In 2017 was inductee into the National Museum of Racing and Hall of Fame. 
Mauro Cichero – footballer
 Eibar Coa – Venezuelan jockey winner of the Breeder's Cup Sprint 2010
 John Cox – Venezuelan-born basketball player.
 Daniel Dhers – world champion BMX cycle ryder
 Milka Duno – Venezuelan-born Indycar driver
Vito Fassano – Italian venezuelan footballer
 Juan Pablo Galavis – professional footballer
 Ozzie Guillén – former major league professional baseball player and manager of Chicago White Sox and Miami Marlins
 Ramon Dominguez – jockey, recipient of three Eclipse Award in the row (2010, 2011 and 2012). In 2016 was inductee into the National Museum of Racing and Hall of Fame.  
 Marcy Hinzmann – American pairs figure skater; her mother was born in Venezuela
 Carlos Hernández (catcher) – Venezuelan baseball player
 Gonzalo López Silvero – Cuban-born sports narrator of Venevision
 AnnMaria De Mars – American judoka
 Richard Mendez – football narrator of ESPN Deportes
 Amleto Monacelli – professional ten-pin bowler, member of American Bowlers Association Halls of Fame
Ivan Olivares – professional basket player
 Julianna Peña – American mixed martial artist
 Eddie Pérez – Venezuelan-American former professional baseball player and current coach
 C.J. Perry – American professional wrestling valet, professional wrestler, model, actress, dancer, and singer. Her mother was born in Venezuela
 Alex Popow – Venezuelan racing driver
 Enzo Potolicchio – Venezuelan racing driver and businessman 
 Ronda Rousey – American mixed martial artist, judoka and actress
 Sam Shepherd – American naturalized as a Venezuelan, in order to be able to play with the Venezuelan national basketball team
 Giovanni Savarese – Venezuelan head coach of New York Cosmos and Portland Timbers soccer clubs. 2015-16 NEC Hall of Fame Inductee
 Donta Smith – American naturalized as a Venezuelan, in order to be able to play with the Venezuelan national basketball team
 Rafael Suárez – Venezuelan Olympian fencer and US international team fencer
 María Alejandra Vento-Kabchi – former professional tennis player
 Cheche Vidal – Venezuelan American soccer player and businessman
 Omar Vizquel – Venezuelan baseball player

Journalists, TV hosts and anchors 

 Luis Alfredo Alvarez – TV host ESPN Latin America
 Fernando Alvarez – TV host ESPN Latin America
Carla Angola – TV host of EVTV Miami
 Mariana Atencio – journalist and news personality working for MSNBC and NBC News. The Huffington Post called her "Our Latina Christiane Amanpour"
 José Aristimuño – journalist, press sub secretary of Democratic Party
 Eleonora Bruzual – writer and journalist of El Nacional and El Nuevo Herald. Conduct a daily radio segment called "Trinchera" on Radio Mambí of Miami (Florida).
 Carlos López Bustamante – journalist spent part of his life in US, where he died in Chicago
 Nelson Bustamante – Venezuelan-born TV host and writer
Lindsay Casinelli – Venezuelan TV host of Univision network
 Manuel Corao – journalist, broadcaster of Miami radio WWFE La Poderosa 670 AM, writer, TV presenter,
 Chiquinquirá Delgado – Venezuelan TV host, model, and actress of Univision network in the United States
 George Duran – Venezuelan-born restaurateur, TV personality, TV producer, and published author
 Lorena Garcia – Venezuelan-born restaurateur, philanthropist, TV personality, TV producer, and published author
 Raúl González – TV host and actor. In Venezuela, he hosted a kids' TV show Supercrópolis. He became one of the hosts on TV show Despierta América of Univisión television network
 Eva Golinger – attorney, RT Network TV host and editor of the Correo del Orinoco International
 Alejandra Oraa – Venezuelan television anchor currently working for CNN en Español
 Reinaldo Herrera – former director of Vanity Fair magazine
 Fausto Malave  - Journalist, news anchor of Noticias Telemundo
 Elizabeth Pérez – Cuban-Venezuelan Emmy – winning television journalist and presenter working for CNN en Español
 Rafael Poleo – Venezuelan journalist and politician
 Beatrice Rangel – Venezuelan politician analyst
 Carolina Sandoval – journalist, broadcaster, writer, TV presenter, and actress
 Daniel Sarcos – Venezuelan TV host, model, and actor of Telemundo network in the United States
Alberto Sardiñas – Venezuelan born syndicated radio personality
 James Tahhan – Venezuelan-born restaurateur known as "Chef James", TV personality, TV producer, and published author
 Lourdes Ubieta – Venezuelan-born Cuban-American radio talk show host on Actualidad Radio 1020/1040 AM
 Patricia Zavala – Venezuelan TV host and model. She hosts E! Entertainment Television's Coffee Break

Military 
 Renato Beluche – Louisiana merchant and privateer at service of Simon Bolivar army who died in Puerto Cabello, Venezuela
 José Manuel Hernández – popular Venezuelan caudillo, army general, congressman, presidential candidate and cabinet member who was also involved in numerous insurrections. Lived in exile in US from 1911 to his death in 1921
 Narciso López – Venezuelan soldier and adventurer, known for four filibuster expeditions aimed at liberating Cuba from Spain in the 1850s
 José Antonio Páez – Venezuelan leader who fought the War of Independence. President of Venezuela once it was independent of the Gran Colombia (1830–1835; 1839–1843; 1861–1863). He lived   exiliated the last years in New York, where he became a philanthropist.
 Patricia Spanic – captain in the US Army. She is sister of soap opera actress Gabriela Spanic.

Politics 
 Luigi Boria – Venezuelan-born mayor of Doral, Florida
 Peter Camejo (1939–2008) – American left-wing activist and Green Party politician. He was of Venezuelan descent.
 Cipriano Castro – President of Venezuela. Expatriated by Juan Vicente Gomez regime in 1908,  spent the rest of his life in exile, mostly in Puerto Rico, where he died in 1928
 Diogenes Escalante – former ambassador of Venezuela in Washington. Spent his last twenty years in USA. 
 Philip Giordano – former Republican mayor of Waterbury, Connecticut, and a convicted sex offender. He was born in Caracas, Venezuela, to Italian parents and his family moved to the United States when he was two years old
 Daniel de Leon – Venezuelan American union labor dirigent in New York.
P. Michael McKinley – American diplomat and the United States Ambassador to Afghanistan
Marcela Mulholland – Political director of Data for Progress
Patricia Rucker - member of the West Virginia House of Representatives
Irene Sáez – Venezuelan politician and beauty queen who was crowned Miss Universe 1981
Leopoldo Martínez Nucete - Born in Caracas. Author, former Congressman in Venezuela (2000-2005), first Venezuelan American to become DNC Member (2017-2021) and President Biden Nominee for U.S. Executive Director of the Inter American Development Bank.

Science 
 Cristina Amon – Venezuelan-born Dean of the University of Toronto Faculty of Applied Science and Engineering
 Baruj Benacerraf – Venezuelan-born American immunologist, 1980 Nobel Prize in Medicine for the discovery of the major histocompatibility complex genes
 Manuel Blum – Venezuelan-born computer scientist who received the Turing Award in 1995
 Emma Brossard – sociologist expert in oil and gas themes
 Florinda Donner– Venezuelan anthropologist
 José Esparza – Venezuelan virologist known for his efforts to promote the international development and testing of vaccines against HIV/AIDS
 Humberto Fernandez Moran – Venezuelan research NASA scientist winner of the John Scott Award, for his invention of the diamond knife
 Niklaus Grünwald – Venezuelan-born biologist. He is currently a research scientist with the USDA Agricultural Research Service
 Werner Hoeger – Venezuelan-born professor emeritus (active) of exercise science at Boise State University
Carlos Machado-Allison – American born Venezuelan biologist
 Luise Margolies – American born archeologist raised in Venezuela
 Evelyn Miralles – Principal Engineer and Lead Virtual Reality Innovator at NASA Johnson Space Center
 William H. Phelps, Jr. – American-born Venezuelan ornithologist and businessman
 William H. Phelps, Sr. – Venezuelan American ornithologist and businessman
 L. Rafael Reif – Venezuelan electrical engineer and inventor. President of the Massachusetts Institute of Technology
 Aldemaro Romero Jr. – Venezuelan biologist, dean of the College of Arts and Sciences at Southern Illinois University Edwardsville
 Gustavo Adolfo Romero – biologist, curator of Herbarium of Harvard University
 Gabriel A. Rincon-Mora – Venezuelan-American electrical engineer, scientist, professor, inventor, and author
 Ignacio Rodríguez-Iturbe – Venezuelan-American hydrologist
 Alejandro Sánchez Alvarado – molecular biologist
Mayly Sánchez – Venezuelan-born particle physicist who researches at Iowa State University
 Santiago Schnell – Venezuelan-born biophysical chemist and computational physiologist who holds an Associate Professorship in Molecular & Integrative Physiology at the University of Michigan
Julian Alfred Steyermark - American born biologyst naturalized Venezuelan

Economists 
 Ricardo Hausmann – economist, writer, Harvard professor
 Moisés Naím – economist, Foreign Police chief editor, writer, TV host

Writers 
 Antonio Arraiz – Venezuelan writer
Alegría Bendayán de Bendelac- writer and jewish poet 
 Perla Farías Lombardini – Telemundo writer
 Boris Izaguirre – Spanish Venezuelan writer and Telemundo TV host
 T. J. MacGregor – Venezuelan-born writer
Nery Santos Gomez – American-Venezuelan writer
 Susana Rotker – writer, essayist
 Miguel Tinker Salas – Venezuelan historian, writer and professor at Pomona College (California)
Tui T. Sutherland - Venezuelan born writer

Activists 
 Mery Godigna Collet – Venezuelan artist, writer, philanthropist and environmental living in Austin, Texas
 Thor Halvorssen Mendoza – Venezuelan human rights advocate and film producer
 Nancy Navarro – social activist. In 2010, President Obama appointed her to the Advisory Commission on Educational Excellence for Hispanics
 Victor Pineda (activist) – social development scholar and disability rights advocate
 Luis Posada Carriles – Cuban-born Venezuelan naturalized former CIA agent. Anticastrist activist
 Jeanmarie Simpson – American peace activist and theatre artist. His father is Venezuelan.
 Sylvia Rivera – American bisexual transgender activist and trans woman

Others 
Federico A. Moreno – lawyer and Chief Judge of United States District Court for the Southern District of Florida
Diego Ruiz – League of Legends player based in Los Angeles

See also 

 Venezuelan American
 Venezuelan Canadian
 Venezuelan people
 List of Venezuelans
 List of Canadians
 List of Americans

References 

Venezuelan
American people of Venezuelan descent
Venezuelan Americans
Venezuelan
American